McTeer is a surname. Notable people with the surname include:

Janet McTeer (born 1961), English actress
Maureen McTeer (born 1952), Canadian writer and lawyer
Robert D. McTeer (born  1943), American economist

See also
McAteer